Carlos Font Puig (born 27 January 1960) is an Andorran alpine skier. He competed at the 1976 Winter Olympics and the 1980 Winter Olympics. He is the brother of alpine skier Miguel Font.

Notes

References

External links
 

1960 births
Living people
Andorran male alpine skiers
Olympic alpine skiers of Andorra
Alpine skiers at the 1976 Winter Olympics
Alpine skiers at the 1980 Winter Olympics
Place of birth missing (living people)